Saint-Pierre-de-Maillé is a commune in the Vienne department in the Nouvelle-Aquitaine region in western France.

Geography
The commune is traversed by the river Gartempe.

Facilities
Since 2020 the village has been home to a Catholic Boarding School for boys, St Peters International College.
https://www.stpetersfr.com/

See also
Communes of the Vienne department

References

Communes of Vienne